Nieste is a river of Hesse and of Lower Saxony, Germany. It flows into the Fulda in Niestetal.

See also
List of rivers of Hesse
List of rivers of Lower Saxony

References

Rivers of Hesse
Rivers of Lower Saxony
North Hesse
Rivers of Germany